The 2000–2001 Amateur Scottish Inter-District Championship was a rugby union competition for Scotland's amateur district teams.

This was the second season of the re-instated amateur Scottish Inter-District Championship. This was played in the professional era, but was intended as a stepping stone for amateurs to the professional game in Scotland.

The Scottish Exiles side re-entered the Inter-District Championship as an amateur district side.

2000-2001 League Table

Results

Round 1

Caledonia:

Scottish Exiles: 

Glasgow District: 

Edinburgh District:

Round 2

Caledonia:

Glasgow District: 

Edinburgh District: 

Scottish Borders:

Round 3

Glasgow District: K Baillie; S Little, A Gibbon, S Petrie, P Price; F Sinclair, I Monaghan; A Cowan, C Docherty, G Sykes, I Smith, C Afuakwah, S Hutton, N McKenzie, J Shaw.

Scottish Exiles: B Hinshelwood; C Aitken, A Craig, S Manson, A McLean; C Day, K Dungait; J Kelly, I McIntosh, D Porte, D Whitehead, N Mitchell, N Broughton, C Malone, C Houston

Scottish Borders: C Richards; C Murray, S Paterson, G Hill, G Douglas; S Nichol, K Reid; I Cornwall, M Landels, D Paxton, I Elliot, S McLeod, J Szkudro, J Henderson, B Keown

Caledonia: M Fraser; S Pearson, C Goodall, M McGrandles, B Price; D Adamson, G Young; T Gordon-Duff, D McKinley, W Anderson, J Syme, K Fraser, S Hannah, C McDonald, J Mackenzie

Round 4

Scottish Exiles: 

Edinburgh District: 

Scottish Borders: 

Glasgow District:

Round 5

Scottish Exiles: 

Scottish Borders: 

Edinburgh District: 

Caledonia:

References

2000–01 in Scottish rugby union
1999–2000
Scot